The Beautiful Sailor is a 1932 French drama film directed by Harry Lachman and starring Pierre Blanchar, Madeleine Renaud and Jean Gabin. It was made by the French subsidiary of Paramount Pictures at the company's Joinville Studios.

Cast
 Pierre Blanchar as Sylvestre  
 Madeleine Renaud as Marinette  
 Jean Gabin as Le capitaine / The captain  
 Rosine Deréan as Mique  
 Charles Lorrain 
 Jean Wall as Valentin  
 Hubert Daix as Braquet

References

Bibliography 
 Dayna Oscherwitz & MaryEllen Higgins. The A to Z of French Cinema. Scarecrow Press, 2009.

External links 
 

1932 films
French drama films
1932 drama films
1930s French-language films
Films directed by Harry Lachman
Paramount Pictures films
Seafaring films
French black-and-white films
French films based on plays
Films shot at Joinville Studios
Films scored by Maurice Yvain
1930s French films